Choudhury Mohan Jatua is an Indian politician. He was the Union Minister of State for Information and Broadcasting from May 2009 to September 2012. He was elected to the 15th Lok Sabha from Mathurapur.

Jatua is a post graduate in commerce from Calcutta University. A former additional deputy inspector general of police of West Bengal, he became a legislator, in 2001, by winning from the Mandirbazar constituency on a Trinamool Congress ticket.

References

Living people
West Bengal MLAs 2001–2006
University of Calcutta alumni
India MPs 2009–2014
Trinamool Congress politicians from West Bengal
Lok Sabha members from West Bengal
India MPs 2014–2019
1938 births
People from South 24 Parganas district
Ramakrishna Mission schools alumni
India MPs 2019–present